Pompeo Posar (February 21, 1921 – April 5, 2004) was a Playboy magazine staff photographer who photographed many centerfold features and accompanying pictures of women featured as playmate of the month. Notably, he was responsible for the December 1968 centerfold of Cynthia Myers and the November 1975 centerfold of Janet Lupo.

He was born in Trieste, Italy. He spent his career working out of an office in Chicago, Illinois, US.

Books and magazines 
Playboy: Portfolio: Pompeo Posar (Dec 1976)
Playboy Magazine: Playmates Forever! part two (Apr 1984)
Playboy Special Edition: Playboy's Pompeo Posar a portfolio of beautiful women (1985)

References 

Playboy photographers
American photographers
Italian photographers
Italian emigrants to the United States
1921 births
2004 deaths